En Lillsk jul is a 1991 Christmas album by Lill Lindfors. It was re-released in 1995.

Track listing

Side A
Klang min vackra bjällra
Knalle Juls vals
Det är en ros utsprungen
Tända ljus i alla fönster
Jag gick mig ut en afton
Den första julen

Side B
Jungfrun hon går i dansen (Zum Tanze da ging ein Mädel)
Nu tändas tusen juleljus
Midnatt råder
Nu har vi ljus-medley
Du tycker du är vacker
Stilla natt (Stille Nacht, helige Nacht)

Contributors
Johan Norberg - guitar
Sam Bengtsson - bass
Klas Anderhell - drums
Peter Ljung - keyboard
Hector Bingert - flute

References 

Lill Lindfors albums
1991 Christmas albums
Christmas albums by Swedish artists
Schlager Christmas albums